Paul Gayton Thormodsgard (born November 10, 1953) is a former Major League Baseball pitcher who played in the late 1970s. He threw and batted right-handed. Thormodsgard played three seasons in the majors, all of them as a member of the Minnesota Twins from 1977 to 1979. In 50 career games, Thormodsgard had a 12–21 record with an ERA of 4.74. He allowed 4 home runs, 33 runs, and had 118 strikeouts.

In , Thormodsgard started 37 games while posting an 11–15 record and striking out 94 batters.

External links

1953 births
Living people
Tampa Tarpons (1957–1987) players
Baseball players from California
Major League Baseball pitchers
Minnesota Twins players
Reno Silver Sox players
Toledo Mud Hens players
Oklahoma City 89ers players